Daniel Gordon Larson (born June 29, 1965) is an American politician in the state of Minnesota. He served in the Minnesota State Senate.

References

Democratic Party Minnesota state senators
Democratic Party members of the Minnesota House of Representatives
1965 births
Living people